The Ohm (older Amana) is a river in Hesse, Germany.

It is a right tributary of the Lahn. The Ohm originates in the Vogelsberg Mountains, east of the town Ulrichstein. It flows generally northwest through Ulrichstein, Mücke, Homberg, Amöneburg, Kirchhain, and joins the Lahn in Cölbe, near Marburg. Its largest tributaries are the Seenbach, Felda, Klein, Wohra and Rotes Wasser.

References

Rivers of Hesse
Rivers of the Vogelsberg
Vogelsberg
Marburg-Biedenkopf
Rivers of Germany